Tosin Jegede is a Nigerian singer. She was a child singing sensation in the 1980s. After releasing her first album in 1985: Children Arise at age five, she released two more albums: Leaders of Africa and Children of Africa in 1989 and 1992 respectively.
She left the country to further her education and earned a degree in Business Decision and Analysis from the University of Bristol, London and worked briefly in the UK as a Pension Adviser. She returned to Nigeria in 2008.

Tosin's mother died in 2012. She started a pet project: One Book One Child  which focuses on the future of the Nigerian child.

Discography
Children Arise (1985)
Leaders of Africa (1989)
Children of Africa (1992)

References

Living people
20th-century Nigerian women singers
Nigerian expatriates in the United Kingdom
Alumni of the University of Bristol
Yoruba women musicians
21st-century Nigerian women  singers
Year of birth missing (living people)